Kent George Nagano GOQ, MSM (born November 22, 1951) is an American conductor and opera administrator. Since 2015, he has been Music Director of the Hamburg State Opera and was Music Director of the Montreal Symphony Orchestra from 2006 to 2020.

Early life and education
Nagano was born in Berkeley, California, while his parents were in graduate school at the University of California, Berkeley. He is a sansei (third-generation) Japanese-American.

He grew up in Morro Bay, a city located on the Central Coast of California in San Luis Obispo County. He studied sociology and music at the University of California, Santa Cruz. After graduation, he moved to San Francisco State University to study music.  While there, he took composition courses from Grosvenor Cooper and Roger Nixon. He also studied at the École Normale de Musique de Paris.

Career
Nagano's first conducting job was with the Opera Company of Boston, where he was assistant conductor to Sarah Caldwell. In 1978, he became the conductor of the Berkeley Symphony, his first music directorship.  He stepped down from this position in 2009.  During his tenure in Berkeley, Nagano became a champion of the music of Olivier Messiaen and initiated a correspondence with him.  He was later invited to work with Messiaen on the final stages of his opera Saint François d'Assise in Paris, where he lived with Messiaen and his wife Yvonne Loriod, whom he came to regard as his "European parents".

In 1982, Nagano conducted the London Symphony Orchestra in several of Frank Zappa's completely orchestral compositions for the first time. Nagano recorded several of Zappa's pieces on the issue London Symphony Orchestra, Vol. 1, where Zappa had personally chosen Nagano to conduct the orchestra. Nagano described this as "my first chance, my first real break". In 1984, while assistant conductor of the Boston Symphony Orchestra, he stepped in for Seiji Ozawa on short notice and without rehearsal, receiving acclaim from the audience, orchestra, and Boston Globe critic Richard Dyer for a "noble performance" of Mahler's Ninth Symphony.

Beginning in 1985, Nagano was the Music Director of the Ojai Music Festival four separate times, the last in 2004, and once alongside Stephen Mosko in 1986.

Nagano has a long history of inventive programming, particularly in the chamber music repertoire. It is impossible not to mention his legendary collaboration with Icelandic artist Björk at the 1996 Verbier Festival performing Arnold Schoenberg's Pierrot Lunaire.

In October 2020, Nagano was elected as a member of the Royal Swedish Academy of Music in consideration of "his eminent merits in the musical art”.

Lyon and Manchester
Nagano was music director of the Opéra National de Lyon from 1988–1998, where he recorded, with the Lyon National Opera Orchestra and chorus, numerous works including Busoni's Doktor Faust, Arlecchino and Turandot, Stravinsky's The Rake's Progress, Offenbach's The Tales of Hoffmann, the premiere of Debussy's Rodrigue et Chimène, Canteloube's Chants d'Auvergne, Berlioz's La damnation de Faust, Carlisle Floyd's Susannah, operas by Richard Strauss, the French version of Salomé and the original version of Ariadne auf Naxos, Peter Eötvös' Tri sestry, Massenet's Werther, Delibes' Coppélia, Poulenc's Dialogues of the Carmelites, orchestral works by Maurice Ravel, and Kurt Weill's The Seven Deadly Sins.

Nagano served as principal conductor of the Hallé Orchestra in Manchester from 1992 to 1999. During his tenure, Nagano received criticism for his expensive and ambitious programming, as well as his conducting fees. However, poor financial management at the orchestra separately contributed to the fiscal troubles of the orchestra. His contract was not renewed after 1999.

Berlin and Los Angeles
Nagano became principal conductor and artistic director of the Deutsches Symphonie-Orchester Berlin in 2000, and served in this position until 2006.  He made a number of recordings with the orchestra, including music by Ludwig van Beethoven, Arnold Schoenberg, Anton Bruckner, Alexander von Zemlinsky, and Gustav Mahler.

Nagano became principal conductor of the Los Angeles Opera (LA Opera) with the 2001–2002 season. In May 2003, Nagano was named the LA Opera's first music director, and he retained this position through 2006.

Recent work
He has been a regular guest at the Salzburg Festival, where he premiered Kaija Saariaho's L'amour de loin in 2000. He also conducted the world premiere of John Adams' The Death of Klinghoffer at la Monnaie in Brussels.

In 2006, Nagano became the music director of both the Orchestre Symphonique de Montréal (OSM) and the Bavarian State Opera. His contract with the Bavarian State Opera did not allow him to be the music director of another opera company.  He concluded his Bavarian State Opera tenure in 2013.  With the OSM, he has conducted commercial recordings for such labels as ECM New Series and Analekta.  His current contract with the OSM is through 2020.   In June 2017, the OSM announced that Nagano is to stand down as its music director at the close of his current contract, at the end of the 2019–2020 season.

Nagano is also one of the Russian National Orchestra's Conductor Collegium.  In August 2012, the Gothenburg Symphony Orchestra announced the appointment of Nagano as its principal guest conductor and artistic advisor, as of the 2013–2014 season, with an initial contract of 3 years.  In September 2012, the Hamburg State Opera announced the appointment of Nagano as its next Generalmusikdirektor (General Music Director) and Chefdirigent (chief conductor), effective with the 2015–2016 season, with an initial contract through the 2019–2020 season.  In October 2017, the company announced the extension of Nagano's Hamburg contract through 2025.

Personal life
Nagano is married to pianist Mari Kodama.  The couple has one daughter, Karin Kei Nagano.

Honours
 Seaver/National Endowment for the Arts Conductors Award in 1985
  Order of the Rising Sun, Gold Rays with Rosette, 2008
 Wilhelm Furtwängler Prize 2010, Beethovenfest Bonn
 Meritorious Service Medal – Invested on: May 24, 2018.
 Honorary Grand Officer of the National Order of Québec, in 2013 (however, part of the 2014 list).

Selected discography 
 Widmann: Arche. Marlis Petersen, Thomas E. Bauer, Iveta Apkalna, Kent Nagano, Philharmonisches Staatsorchester Hamburg. ECM 2605 (2018)
 Beethoven: Nine Symphonies – 'O Mensch, gib acht! Entre les Lumières et la Révolution'. Montreal Symphony Orchestra. Analekta
 Beethoven: Piano Concertos Nos 4 and 5.  Till Fellner, piano; Montreal Symphony Orchestra. ECM 2114
 Arthur Honegger and Jacques Ibert:  L'Aiglon. Decca
 Prokofiev: Peter and the Wolf. Jean-Pascal Beintus: Wolf Tracks. Mikhail Gorbachev, Bill Clinton, Kent Nagano, Sophia Loren, Russian National Orchestra. PENTATONE PTC 5186011 (2003). 
 Saint-Saëns, Samy Moussa, Kaija Saariaho:  'Symphonie et créations avec orgue'. Olivier Latry, Jean-Willy Kunz, organists; Montreal Symphony Orchestra. Analekta
 Tchaikovsky: Violin Concerto & Piano Concerto. Christian Tetzlaff, Nikolai Lugansky, Kent Nagano, Russian National Orchestra. PENTATONE PTC 5186022 (2003)
 Chopin, Carl Loewe: Piano Concertos. Mari Kodama, Kent Nagano, Russian National Orchestra. PENTATONE PTC 5186026 (2003)
 Bruckner: Symphony No 3. Deutsches Symphonie-Orchester Berlin, Kent Nagano. Harmonia Mundi 801817 (2003)
 Mahler: Symphony No 8. Deutsches Symphonie-Orchester Berlin, Kent Nagano, Sally Matthews, Sylvia Greenberg, Lynne Dawson, Elena Manistina, Sophie Koch, Robert Gambill, Detlef Roth, Jan-Hendrik Rootering. Harmonia Mundi 801858/59 (2004)
Saint-Saëns, Andrew Wan, violin, Complete Violin Concertos (n°1, n°2, n°3), Orchestre symphonique de Montréal, conductor Kent Nagano. CD Analekta 2015
Ginastera: Violin Concerto, Bernstein: Sérénade, Moussa: Concerto "Adrano", Andrew Wan , violin, Orchestre symphonique de Montréal, conductor Kent Nagano. CD Analekta 2019

References

External links
 
 Kent Nagano at the Montreal Symphony Orchestra
 
 Kent Nagano discography

1951 births
American male conductors (music)
Music directors (opera)
American classical musicians of Japanese descent
Living people
Opera managers
Deutsche Grammophon artists
University of California, Santa Cruz alumni
San Francisco State University alumni
Grammy Award winners
Honorary Members of the Royal Academy of Music
Recipients of the Order of the Rising Sun, 4th class
Juno Award for Classical Album of the Year – Vocal or Choral Performance winners
21st-century American conductors (music)
21st-century American male musicians
Erato Records artists